Krzysztof Kazimierczak (born 13 March 1981 in Lubin) is a Polish footballer who last played for KS Polkowice.

He was part of the Wisła Płock team that won the Polish Cup in 2006.

Career

Club
In July 2011, Kazimierczak joined KS Polkowice.

References

External links
 

1981 births
Living people
Polish footballers
Miedź Legnica players
Zagłębie Lubin players
Wisła Płock players
Boavista F.C. players
Polonia Warsaw players
Górnik Łęczna players
Górnik Polkowice players
People from Lubin
Sportspeople from Lower Silesian Voivodeship
Association football defenders